The Czech Republic will send a delegation to compete at the 2010 Winter Paralympics in Vancouver. 19 athletes will compete in 2 disciplines.

Alpine skiing 

Women

Men

Ice sledge hockey 

The Czech Republic will be competing in ice sledge hockey.

See also
Czech Republic at the 2010 Winter Olympics
Czech Republic at the Paralympics

References

External links
Vancouver 2010 Paralympic Games official website
International Paralympic Committee official website

Nations at the 2010 Winter Paralympics
2010
Paralympics